Below is the list of populated places in Istanbul Province, Turkey by the districts. All districts of Istanbul Province are considered as a part of Greater Istanbul and most districts have no populated places other than the district center itself. In the following lists first place in each list is the administrative center of the district.

According to Law act no 6360, all Turkish provinces with a population more than 750 000 were renamed as metropolitan municipality. All districts in those provinces became second level municipalities and all villages in those districts  were renamed as a neighborhoods  Thus the villages below are officially neighborhoods of İstanbul.

Adalar 
 Adalar

Arnavutköy
 Arnavutköy
 Baklalı, Arnavutköy
 Balaban, Arnavutköy
 Boyalık, Arnavutköy
 Hacımaşlı, Arnavutköy
 Karaburun, Arnavutköy
 Tayakadın, Arnavutköy
 Yassıören, Arnavutköy
 Yeniköy, Arnavutköy

Ataşehir 
 Ataşehir

Avcılar 
 Avcılar

Bağcılar 
 Bağcılar

Bahçelievler 
 Bahçelievler

Bakırköy 
 Bakırköy

Başakşehir 
 Başakşehir
 Şamlar

Bayrampaşa 
 Bayrampaşa

Beşiktaş
 Beşiktaş

Beykoz
 Beykoz
 Akbaba, Beykoz
 Alibahadır, Beykoz
 Anadolufeneri, Beykoz
 Bozhane, Beykoz
 Cumhuriyet, Beykoz
 Dereseki, Beykoz
 Elmalı, Beykoz
 Göllü, Beykoz
 Görele, Beykoz
 İshaklı, Beykoz
 Kaynarca, Beykoz
 Kılıçlı, Beykoz
 Mahmutşevketpaşa, Beykoz
 Örnekköy, Beykoz
 Öyümce, Beykoz
 Paşamandıra, Beykoz
 Polonez, Beykoz
 Poyraz, Beykoz
 Riva, Beykoz
 Zerzavatçı, Beykoz

Beylikdüzü
 Beylikdüzü

Beyoğlu
 Beyoğlu

Büyükçekmece 
 Büyükçekmece

Çatalca
 Çatalca
 Akalan, Çatalca
 Aydınlar, Çatalca
 Başak, Çatalca
 Belgrat, Çatalca
 Celepköy, Çatalca
 Çanakça, Çatalca
 Dağyenice, Çatalca
 Elbasan, Çatalca
 Gökçeali, Çatalca
 Gümüşpınar, Çatalca
 Hallaçlı, Çatalca
 Hisarbeyli, Çatalca
 İhsaniye, Çatalca
 İnceğiz, Çatalca
 Kabakça, Çatalca
 Kalfa, Çatalca
 Karamandere, Çatalca
 Kestanelik, Çatalca
 Kızılcaali, Çatalca
 Oklalı, Çatalca
 Ormanlı, Çatalca
 Örcünlü, Çatalca
 Örencik, Çatalca
 Subaşı, Çatalca
 Yalıköy, Çatalca
 Yaylacık, Çatalca
 Yazlık, Çatalca

Çekmeköy 
 Çekmeköy
 Hüseyinli, Çekmeköy
 Koçullu, Çekmeköy
 Reşadiye, Çekmeköy
 Sırapınar, Çekmeköy

Esenler 
 Esenler

Esenyurt 
 Esenyurt

Eyüp
 Eyüp
 Ağaçlı, Eyüp
 Akpınar, Eyüp
 Çiftalan, Eyüp
 Işıklar, Eyüp
 İhsaniye, Eyüp
 Odayeri, Eyüp
 Pirinççi, Eyüp

Fatih 
 Fatih

Gaziosmanpaşa
 Gaziosmanpaşa

Güngören 
 Güngören

Kadıköy
 Kadıköy

Kağıthane 
 Kağıthane

Kartal
 Kartal

Küçükçekmece 
 Küçükçekmece

Pendik 
 Pendik
 Ballıca, Pendik
 Emirli, Pendik
 Göçbeyli, Pendik
 Kurna, Pendik
 Kurtdoğmuş, Pendik

Maltepe 
 Maltepe

Sancaktepe 
 Sancektepe
 Paşaköy, Sancaktepe

Sarıyer
 Sarıyer
 Demirci, Sarıyer
 Garipçe, Sarıyer
 Gümüşdere, Sarıyer
 Kısırkaya, Sarıyer
 Kumköy, Sarıyer
 Rumelifeneri, Sarıyer
 Uskumruköy, Sarıyer
 Zekeriyaköy, Sarıyer

Silivri
 Silivri
 Akören, Silivri
 Bekirli, Silivri
 Beyciler, Silivri
 Büyükkılıçlı, Silivri
 Çanta, Silivri
 Çayırdere, Silivri
 Çeltik, Silivri
 Danamandıra, Silivri
 Fenerköy, Silivri
 Kurfallı, Silivri
 Küçüksinekli, Silivri
 Sayalar, Silivri
 Seymen, Silivri
 Sinekli, Silivri

Sultanbeyli 
 Sultanbeyli

Sultangazi
 Sultangazi

Şile
 Şile
Ağaçdere, Şile
Ahmetli, Şile
Akçakese, Şile
Alacalı, Şile
Avcıkoru, Şile
Bıçkıdere, Şile
Bozkoca, Şile
Bucaklı, Şile
Çataklı, Şile
Çayırbaşı, Şile
Çelebi, Şile
Çengilli, Şile
Darlık, Şile
Değirmençayırı, Şile
Doğancılı, Şile
Erenler, Şile
Esenceli, Şile
Geredeli, Şile
Göçe, Şile
Gökmaslı, Şile
Göksu, Şile
Hacıllı, Şile
Hasanlı, Şile
İmrendere, Şile
İmrenli, Şile
İsaköy, Şile
Kabakoz, Şile
Kadıköy, Şile
Kalem, Şile
Karabeyli, Şile
Karacaköy, Şile
Karakiraz, Şile
Karamandere, Şile
Kervansaray, Şile
Kızılca, Şile
Korucu, Şile
Kömürlük, Şile
Kurfallı, Şile
Kurna, Şile
Meşrutiyet, Şile
Oruçoğlu, Şile
Osmanköy, Şile
Ovacık, Şile
Sahilköy, Şile
Satmazlı, Şile
Sofular, Şile
Soğullu, Şile
Sortullu, Şile
Şuayipli, Şile
Tekeköy, Şile
Ulupelit, Şile
Üvezli, Şile
Yaka, Şile
Yaylalı, Şile
Yazımanayır, Şile
Yeniköy, Şile
Yeşilvadi, Şile

Şişli 
 Şişli

Tuzla 
 Tuzla

Ümraniye 
 Ümraniye

Üsküdar
Üsküdar

Zeytinburnu
 Zeytinburnu

References 

Istanbul-related lists
List
Istanbul